Michaela Brunngraber (born 16 December 1964) is an Austrian cyclist. She competed in the women's points race at the 2000 Summer Olympics.

References

External links
 

1964 births
Living people
Austrian female cyclists
Olympic cyclists of Austria
Cyclists at the 2000 Summer Olympics
Cyclists from Vienna
20th-century Austrian women